Alicia Izaguirre Albiztur (11 June 1932–4 June 2014) was a Spanish politician from the Spanish Socialist Workers' Party (PSOE). She was the first woman candidate for the presidency of an autonomous community, the presidency of La Rioja in the 1987 election. She had served as the Government's Delegate in Cantabria from December 1982 to July 1984 and as Civil governor of Álava from July 1984 to April 1987, of the province of Cáceres from September 1988 to July 1993 and of the province of Badajoz as well as Government's Delegate in Extremadura from August 1993 to May 1996.

References

1932 births
2014 deaths
Spanish Socialist Workers' Party politicians